Siren's Song is the second studio album by The Union, the English rock band formed by ex-Thunder guitarist Luke Morley and Peter Shoulder (formerly of Winterville). It was released on 3 October 2011.

Track listing
All tracks produced, written and arranged by Luke Morley and Peter Shoulder.

Personnel
 Peter Shoulder - lead vocals, guitar, mandolin, piano, Hammond organ, pedal steel
 Luke Morley - guitar, vocals, percussion
 Chris Childs - bass guitar
 Dave McCluskey - drums
 Phil Martin - drums

Additional musicians
Helena May Harrison - backing vocals
Katy Burgess - backing vocals
Alex Beamont - cello

References

The Union (band) albums
2011 albums
Albums recorded at Rockfield Studios